This is a list of the Austrian Singles Chart number-one hits of 1995.

See also
1995 in music

References

1995 in Austria
1995 record charts
Lists of number-one songs in Austria